Hombori is a small town and rural commune in the Cercle of Douentza in the Mopti Region of Mali. The commune contains 25 villages and in the 2009 census had a population of 23,099. The town lies just to the north of the Hombori Tondo mesa on the R15 highway linking Mopti and Gao.

Humburi Senni Songhay and Fulfulde are spoken in Hombori. There is a large Tuesday weekly market in the town.

Climate
Hombori lies on the border between a hot arid climate (Köppen BWh) and a hot semi-arid climate (BSh). Almost all the rainfall occurs between late June and the middle of September. The mean annual rainfall in the period 1950 to 2007 was  but there are large year-to-year variations. The provision of drinking water in the commune is difficult as there is no continuous aquifer which can be tapped by deep wells.

Sites and fame

The town is known for its vernacular architecture of rock-built houses with narrow alleyways and tunnels. The area around Hombori features rock formations similar in appearance to those in the more well known Monument Valley and includes the Needles of Gami, a popular rock climbing location. Mount Hombori, Mali's highest point at 1153 meters, is nearby.

History
Hombori is an ancient town of the Dogon people; its exact age is unknown.
After the invasion of the Moroccan Saadi dynasty in 1591, one part of the royal family of Gao established themselves in Hombori. The Songhai, now the majority population, later followed the royal refugees to this area.

Hombori remains a focus of Songhai Empire traditions but was also a strategic point for the conquest of southern Mali by the Songhai successor states.

Those local villages deeper in the hills (for example Tabi, 30 km away) were never conquered or directly colonised, and retain their traditional cultures.

The Songhai leadership were largely coopted by the French Colonial administration upon their arrival around 1900, while much of the Dogon community fled to nearby mountains, a process that had earlier begun to escape Moorish slave raids.

The religion of the community is Islam by a vast majority. Sufism and Shiism are the dominant belief systems in the area.

Some sequences of Souleymane Cissé's film, Yeelen, were shot in Hombori.

References

External links
.
.
 Project Hombori

Communes of Mopti Region